United Nations Security Council Resolution 279, adopted unanimously on May 12, 1970, at 15 words is the second shortest Security Council resolution ever adopted; it reads simply "The Security Council Demands the immediate withdrawal of all Israeli armed forces from Lebanese territory." The resolution came in the context of Palestinian insurgency in South Lebanon.

See also 
 List of United Nations Security Council Resolutions 201 to 300 (1965–1971)

References 
Text of the Resolution at undocs.org

External links
 

 0279
 0279
Palestinian insurgency in South Lebanon
1970 in Lebanon
1970 in Israel
 0279
May 1970 events